Sidi Tiémoko Touré is an Ivorian politician, current Minister of Animal and Fisheries Resources.

Biography 
Sidi Tiémoko Touré is the current Ivorian Minister of Fisheries and Animal Resources and has been since April 6, 2021 in the second Patrick Achi's Government Patrick Achi. Sidi Tiémoko Touré comes from the Béoumi district, where he served as deputy from 2016 to 2021.

Academic background 
Born to a housewife and a journalist, Sidi Tiémoko Touré is a graduate of the École Militaire Préparatoire Technique (EMPT) of Bingerville, the Lycée Technique d’Abidjan (LTA), thde l’Institut National Polytechnique Houphouët- Boigny of Yamoussoukro (Ex-INSET). He also holds a certificate from the MUST program (Management of Strategic Units) of the Hautes Études Commerciales (HEC) in Paris and the Centre d’Étude Diplomatique et Stratégique (CEDS) in Paris.

As a commercial engineer, he also holds a master's degree in Management and Business Administration from INSTEC (Institut National Supérieur des Techniques Commerciales) and a master's degree in Marketing and Communication from École de Commerce et de Gestion.

Professional life 
With the skills he acquired during these various training courses, he began his professional career in the private sector. This led him first to the Société Ivoirienne des Emballages Métalliques, then to the Société de Commercialisation de Matériel Électriques, as well as Schneider Electric West and Central Africa.

Political career

First steps in politics 
Sidi Tiémoko Touré began his political career with the Rassemblement des Républicains (RDR) in 1994, the year the party was created. Within this formation, he contributed, with the First Secretary General of the Party, the late Djeni Kobina, to the establishment and implementation of the youth branch, namely the Rassemblement des Jeunes Républicains (RJR).

In 1994, he became President of the RJR Cocody-Aghien. Two years later, he became interim President of the National Executive Bureau of the same
organization.

In 2006, Alassane OUATTARA, then President of the Rassemblement Des Républicains (RDR), appointed him as Chief of Staff until 2011. Following his accession to the supreme magistracy, he became the Chief of Staff of the President of the Republic, HEM. Alassane OUATTARA. In this capacity, he was also a member of the National Security Council of Côte d'Ivoire, until 2015.

Entry into the Government 
He joined the government in May 2015 as Minister Delegate to the President of the Republic, in charge of Youth Promotion and Employment. He was reinforced in his functions in January 2016, as Minister of Youth Promotion, Youth Employment and Civic Service in the government led by Daniel Kablan Duncan.

In July 2018, under the Amadou Gon Coulibaly II Government, Sidi Tiémoko Touré was appointed Minister of Communication and Media and designated Government Spokesperson. On August 3, 2020, he was reappointed to the same position in the Hamed Bakayoko Government.

When Prime Minister Patrick ACHI formed his first government in April 2021, he appointed Sidi Tiémoko Touré as Minister of Fisheries and Animal Resources.

Arrival at the National Assembly 
«STT», as his supporters call him, is the Deputy of the Rassemblement des Houphouétiste pour la Démocratie et la Paix (RHDP) of the electoral district of Ando-Kekrenou, Béoumi and Kondrobo, communes and sub-prefectures, during the 2016 – 2021 legislature.

International Network 
President of the Organization of the Liberal Youth of Côte d'Ivoire (OJLCI) in 1998, he became, in 2003, the President of the Organization of the African Liberal Youth (OJLA) until 2007, then a member of the board of the International Federation of Liberal and Radical Youth (IFLRY) before serving as Treasurer of the International Liberal between 2012 and 2013.

Bibliography 
Sidi Tiemoko Touré is not only a politician, he is also an author. He has published two books: the first entitled "Alassane Ouattara et les Jeunes, le temps des Possibles" a collection of testimonies and tributes to the one he considers his mentor and his "father" ; and the second entitled "Alassane Ouattara, aux portes de l’Emergence 2011-2020" a book that highlights the record of the President since he took office in 2011 until 2020.

Awards 
Officer of the Ivorian National Order, Sidi Tiemoko Touré is also Commander of the Order of Merit of Communication and Commander of Order of Agricultural Merit in Côte d'Ivoire.

Notes and references 

Ivorian politicians
Rally of the Republicans politicians
Government ministers of Ivory Coast
HEC Paris alumni
Year of birth missing (living people)
Living people